Henry Edward Hugh Blakeney (8 October 1890 – 12 February 1958) was a British track and field athlete who competed in the 1912 Summer Olympics.

In 1912 he was eliminated in the semi-finals of the 110 metre hurdles competition. In the 100 metres event he was eliminated in the first round.

References

External links
British Olympic Association profile

1890 births
1958 deaths
British male sprinters
British male hurdlers
Olympic athletes of Great Britain
Athletes (track and field) at the 1912 Summer Olympics